Rosa Parks station (French: Gare Rosa Parks) is a railway station in the 19th arrondissement of Paris, France near the Porte d'Aubervilliers. It is on the RER network, and also has a tram stop. The station opened on 13 December 2015, and bears the name of American civil rights activist Rosa Parks.

History
The station, initially named Évangile because of its proximity to Rue de l'Évangile, is located on the site of the former Est-Ceinture and Évangile stations, both part of the Parisian circular line "Petite Ceinture".

The remnants of Évangile station were demolished in 2011. A new stop on Tram Line 3b opened at the station site on 15 December 2012 and the RER station opened on 13 December 2015.

The station bears the name of American civil rights activist Rosa Parks. Explaining the name, Annick Lepetit, deputy of Bertrand Delanoë (Mayor of Paris from 2001 to 2014) in charge of transport, stated: "We wanted at least 50% female names. There has been much debate, especially with RATP, which favours existing place names, but for Rosa Parks there was a consensus: this is necessary for a tram station, it is a strong symbol".

Services
The station, located on the Paris-Est–Strasbourg-Ville and Paris-Est–Mulhouse-Ville railways, both departing from Paris-Est, is served by the suburban line RER E. Île-de-France tramway Line 3b opened on 15 December 2012 with a stop located at the station.

Gallery

References

External links

 
 

Réseau Express Régional stations
Memorials to Rosa Parks
Buildings and structures in the 19th arrondissement of Paris
Railway stations in France opened in 2015